The Christelijk Gymnasium Sorghvliet, commonly known simply as Sorghvliet, is an independent Protestant gymnasium in The Hague. Sorghvliet is consistently ranked among the best schools in the Netherlands by the influential magazine Elsevier. Sorghvliet has a long list of notable alumni, including multiple Dutch politicians, writers, athletes, entrepreneurs, members of the Dutch royal family, and scientists, including one Nobel laureate.

Notable alumni
  Catharina-Amalia, Princess of Orange
  Princess Alexia of the Netherlands
Princess Ariane of the Netherlands
  Jozias van Aartsen, VVD politician and former Mayor of The Hague
  Laurens Jan Brinkhorst, D66 politician and former Deputy Prime Minister
  Princess Laurentien of the Netherlands (née Brinkhorst)
  Bas de Gaay Fortman, former Senator
  Marnix van Rij, CDA politician and former Minister of Finance
  Morris Tabaksblat, CEO of Unilever
  Simon van der Meer, physicist and winner of the 1984 Nobel Prize in Physics
  F. Springer, pseudonym of Carel Jan Schneider, diplomat and writer
  Tomas Ross, pseudonym of Willem Pieter Hogendoorn, writer
  Daphne Jongejans, Olympic diver
  Edwin Jongejans, Olympic diver

References 

1908 establishments in the Netherlands
Educational institutions established in 1908
Gymnasiums in the Netherlands
Schools in The Hague